The Centre Franco-Ontarien de ressources en alphabétisation (Centre for Franco-Ontarian resources in literacy), or Centre FORA, is a literacy organization, based in Greater Sudbury, which promotes literacy among Franco-Ontarian communities.

It has offered services since 1989 with educational resources for schools and the community. They target education for all ages including adult education, publishing, developing educational materials, programs and resources for educators and parents.

External links
 Centre FORA

Education in Greater Sudbury
French-language education in Ontario
Educational organizations based in Ontario
Organizations based in Greater Sudbury